There have been five baronetcies created for persons with the surname Clarke (as distinct from Clark, Clerk and Clerke), two in the Baronetage of England and three in the Baronetage of the United Kingdom. Two of the creations are extant as of 2010.

The Clarke Baronetcy, of Salford Shirland in the County of Warwick, was created in the Baronetage of England on 1 May 1617 for Simon Clarke. He later supported the Royalist cause during the Civil War. The fifth Baronet was convicted of highway robbery. He managed to escape the death penalty but was deported to Jamaica. The 6th baronet owned slaves and a plantation in Jamaica. He sent 5-year-old Amelia Lewsham as a present to his son. The title became either extinct or dormant on the death of the eleventh Baronet in 1898.  Henry Stephenson Clarke (1839–1919), a descendant of Woodchurch Clarke, younger son of the first Baronet, was a Colonel in the Royal Artillery. His grandson Sir Ashley Clarke was Ambassador to Italy between 1953 and 1962.

The Clarke Baronetcy, of Snailwell in the County of Cambridge, was created in the Baronetage of England on 25 July 1698 for Samuel Clarke. The second Baronet sat as Member of Parliament for Cambridgeshire. The third Baronet was Sheriff of Huntingdonshire and Cambridgeshire between 1753 and 1754. The title became extinct on the death of the sixth Baronet in 1806.

The Clarke, later Clarke-Travers Baronetcy, of Crosses Green in the County of Cork, was created in the Baronetage of the United Kingdom on 28 June 1804. For more information on this creation, see Clarke-Travers baronets.

The Clarke Baronetcy, of Dunham Lodge in the County of Norfolk, was created in the Baronetage of the United Kingdom on 30 September 1831 for Charles Clarke, Physician to Queen Adelaide. The third Baronet was a prominent soldier. The sixth Baronet adopted the additional Christian name of Tobias in 1962. The current baronet, Sir Lawrence Clarke, was selected for Great Britain in the XXX Olympiad in London in 2012 for the 110m hurdles.

The Clarke Baronetcy, of Rupertswood in the Colony of Victoria, was created in the Baronetage of the United Kingdom on 29 December 1882 for the Australian landowner and philanthropist William Clarke. The Clarke family was originally from Weston Zoyland, Somerset. William John Turner Clarke, father of the first Baronet, settled in Australia in 1829. He was a member of the Legislative Council of Victoria. Sir Francis Grenville Clarke (1879–1955), fifth son of the first Baronet, was President of the Legislative Council of Victoria between 1923 and 1943.

Clarke baronets, of Salford Shirland (1617)

Sir Simon Clarke, 1st Baronet (died )
Sir John Clarke, 2nd Baronet (died c. 1679)
Sir Simon Clarke, 3rd Baronet (1635–1687)
Sir Simon Clarke, 4th Baronet (c. 1662–1718)
Sir Simon Peter Clarke, 5th Baronet (died 1736)
Sir Simon Clarke, 6th Baronet (died 1770) - Jamaican plantation owner
Sir Simon Clarke, 7th Baronet (1727–1777) buried in Jamaica
Sir Philip Haughton Clarke, 8th Baronet (1761–1798)
Sir Simon Haughton Clarke, 9th Baronet (1764–1832)
Sir Simon Haughton Clarke, 10th Baronet (1818–1849)
Sir Philip Haughton Clarke, 11th Baronet (1819–1898)

Clarke baronets, of Snailwell (1698)

Sir Samuel Clarke, 1st Baronet (died 1719)
Sir Robert Clarke, 2nd Baronet (1683–1746)
Sir Samuel Clarke, 3rd Baronet (1712–1758)
Sir Robert Clarke, 4th Baronet (1714–1770)
Sir John Clarke, 5th Baronet (c. 1763–1782)
Sir Arthur Clarke, 6th Baronet (1715–1806)

Clarke, later Clarke-Travers baronets, of Crosses Green (1804)
see Clarke-Travers baronets

Clarke baronets, of Dunham Lodge (1831)

Sir Charles Mansfield Clarke, 1st Baronet (1782–1857)
Reverend Sir Charles Clarke, 2nd Baronet (1812–1899)
General Sir Charles Mansfield Clarke, 3rd Baronet GCB GCVO (1839–1932)
Sir Orme Bigland Clarke, 4th Baronet CBE (1880–1949)
Sir Humphrey Orme Clarke, 5th Baronet (1906–1973)
Sir (Charles Mansfield) Tobias "Toby" Clarke, 6th Baronet (1939–2019)
Sir Charles Lawrence Somerset Clarke, 7th Baronet (born 1990).

The heir presumptive is the current holder's cousin Nicholas Orme Clarke (born 1976).

Clarke baronets, of Rupertswood (1882)

Sir William John Clarke, 1st Baronet (1831–1897)
Sir Rupert Turner Havelock Clarke, 2nd Baronet (1865–1926)
Sir Rupert William John Clarke, 3rd Baronet (1919–2005)
Sir Rupert Grant Alexander Clarke, 4th Baronet (born 1947)

The heir apparent to the baronetcy is Rupert Robert William Clarke (born 1981), only son of the 4th Baronet.

See also
Clark baronets
Clerk baronets
Clerke baronets
Clerk family
Clarke-Jervoise baronets

Notes

References 
Kidd, Charles, Williamson, David (editors). Debrett's Peerage and Baronetage (1990 edition). New York: St Martin's Press, 1990, 

 

 
Baronetcies in the Baronetage of the United Kingdom
Extinct baronetcies in the Baronetage of England
1617 establishments in England
1898 disestablishments in England